Transcription factor IIIA is a protein that in humans is encoded by the GTF3A gene. It was first isolated and characterized by Wolffe and Brown in 1988.

The TFIIIA in Xenopus was the first zinc finger protein discovered.

References

Further reading

External links 
 

Transcription factors